William Whitty Hall (October 15, 1810 - May 10, 1876) was an American physician, writer and pioneer editor of health magazines.

Biography

Hall was born in Paris, Kentucky. He graduated from Centre College in 1830 and studied both medicine and theology. He received his M.D. from Transylvania College in 1836. He was ordained to the Presbyterian ministry and was a missionary in Texas. He practiced medicine in New Orleans and Cincinnati and established his consultation practice in New York City in 1851.

In 1854, he began to publish Hall's Journal of Health. After his death the journal was absorbed by Popular Science. From 1875, he edited Hall's Medical Adviser. Hall married twice. His first wife was Hannah Mattock and his second was Magdalen Matilda Robertson.

Anthropologist Matthew Wolf-Meyer has described Hall as a forgotten researcher in the field of sleep science.

Death

It was reported that Hall never weighed more than 125 pounds and he worked from 5 am to 10 pm every day. He fell in a fit on a street in New York and died on May 10, 1876.

Selected publications

Health and Disease (1864)
Hall's Health Tracts (1868)
Sleep, Or, The Hygiene of the Night (1870)
Fun Better Than Physic: Or, Everybody's Life-Preserver (1871)
Health by Good Living (1871)
Bronchitis, and Kindred Diseases (1872)
The Guide-Board to Health, Peace, and Competence; Or, The Road to Happy Old Age (1872)
Health at Home (1874)
How to Live Long (1875)

References

External links
W. W. Hall - Online Books

1810 births
1876 deaths
19th-century American physicians
American health and wellness writers
American nutritionists
Diet food advocates
Sleep researchers
Transylvania University alumni